This is a list of episodes for the Telemundo series El Señor de los Cielos. On 15 February 2022, the series was renewed for an eighth season, that premiered on 17 January 2023.

Series overview

Episodes

Season 1 (2013)

Season 2 (2014)

Season 3 (2015)

Season 4 (2016)

Season 5 (2017)

Season 6 (2018)

Season 7 (2019–20)

Season 8 (2023)

Special

Special 2017

Other specials

Notes

References 

 
Lists of Mexican drama television series episodes
Lists of Spanish television series episodes